Paul Hoffman (born March 30, 1956) is the president and CEO of the Liberty Science Center in Jersey City, New Jersey. He is also a prominent author, science educator, food entrepreneur, Moth storyteller, and host of the PBS television series Great Minds of Science.

Career 
He was president and editor in chief of Discover, in a ten-year tenure with that magazine, and served as president and publisher of Encyclopædia Britannica before returning full-time to writing and consulting work. He lives in Brooklyn and Woodstock, New York. Author of at least ten books, he has appeared on CBS This Morning and The NewsHour with Jim Lehrer as a correspondent. Hoffman is also a paradoxologist using the pseudonym Dr. Crypton. He designed the puzzle in the 1984 book Treasure: In Search of the Golden Horse. He also designed the treasure map in the 1984 film, Romancing the Stone, starring Michael Douglas, Kathleen Turner, and Danny DeVito.  Paul is a chess player rated around 1900 (or class-A level) who was the last man standing when world champion Magnus Carlsen played blindfold blitz chess against three challengers.

Hoffman, who holds a B.A. degree summa cum laude from Harvard, is the winner of the first National Magazine Award for Feature Writing and is a member of the American Academy of Arts and Sciences. Chicago magazine once called him "the smartest man in the world," but Hoffman claims the editors must have caught him on a particularly good day. The New York Times called Hoffman "the mayor of strange places" because of his penchant for checking in at out-of-the-way places on Foursquare. Paul's most celebrated book, The Man Who Loved Only Numbers, was featured in clue 104 Down in the Sunday Times crossword puzzle for 11/15/2015. That book, a biography of the Hungarian mathematician Paul Erdős, was awarded the Royal Society Science Books Prize.

Before joining Liberty Science Center in October 2011, Hoffman was the editorial chairman of the video interview website Big Think, where he personally interviewed Dick Cavett, Richard Dawkins, Annie Duke, Arianna Huffington, John Irving, Penn Jillette, Anatoly Karpov, Garry Kasparov and Ed Koch, among others.

Hoffman was the creative director of the Beyond Rubik's Cube exhibition, which appeared at venues around the world starting with LSC in Jersey City, NJ, the Great Lakes Science Center in Cleveland, and Telus World of Science in Edmonton, Canada. Exhibition elements included a 35-foot-tall rooftop cube made of lights that people could manipulate with their cellphones, a $2.5 million cube made of diamonds, a giant cube displaying the inner workings of the puzzle, and cube-solving robots. Google was LSC's creative partner in the creation of the 7,000-square-foot exhibition.

These days Hoffman is spearheading the development of SciTech Scity, a 30-acre "City of Tomorrow" innovation campus in Jersey City that aims to launch and grow world-changing science and technology companies and reimagine public school science education.

Partial bibliography

References

External links
Paul Hoffman's bio
Paul Hoffman's blog
Presenting at Cusp Conference 2009 (video)

1956 births
Harvard University alumni
American male biographers
American science writers
American magazine editors
Living people
People from Brooklyn
People from Woodstock, New York
21st-century American non-fiction writers
20th-century American biographers
Journalists from New York City
20th-century American male writers
Discover (magazine) people
Historians from New York (state)
21st-century American male writers